James Louis Word (born c. 1953) is an American politician and a Democratic former member of the Arkansas House of Representatives for District 16 from 2009 to 2015. He was term-limited and ineligible to seek a fourth legislative term in 2014.

Education
Word earned his bachelor's degree from the University of Arkansas at Pine Bluff and his MPA from University of Wisconsin–Milwaukee.

Elections
2012 Word was unopposed for both the May 22, 2012 Democratic Primary and the November 6, 2012 General election.
2000 When the District 73 seat was open, Word ran in the three-way 2000 Democratic primary but lost to Booker Clemons, who was unopposed for the November 7, 2000 General election.
2008 Redistricted to District 16, when Earnest Brown left the Legislature and left the seat open, Word placed first in the three-way May 20, 2008 Democratic Primary with 1,253 votes (38.9%), won the June 10 runoff election with 1,269 votes (67.1%), and was unopposed for the November 4, 2008 General election.
2010 Word was unopposed for both the May 18, 2010 Democratic primary and the November 2, 2010 general election.

References

External links
Official page at the Arkansas House of Representatives

James Word at Ballotpedia
James L. Word at the National Institute on Money in State Politics

Place of birth missing (living people)
1953 births
Living people
African-American state legislators in Arkansas
Democratic Party members of the Arkansas House of Representatives
Politicians from Pine Bluff, Arkansas
University of Arkansas at Pine Bluff alumni
University of Wisconsin–Milwaukee alumni
21st-century African-American people
20th-century African-American people